The 2022 World Games were held in Birmingham, Alabama, United States, from July 7 to July 17, 2022.

Acrobatic gymnastics

Aerobic gymnastics

Air sports

Archery

Artistic roller skating

Beach handball

Boules sports

Bowling

Canoe marathon

Canoe polo

Cue sports

Dancesport

Duathlon

Finswimming

Fistball

Flag football

Floorball

Flying disc

Inline hockey

Ju-jitsu

Karate

Kickboxing

Korfball

Lacrosse

Lifesaving

Muaythai

Orienteering

Parkour

Powerlifting

Racquetball

Rhythmic gymnastics

Road speed skating

Softball

Sport climbing

Squash

Sumo

Track speed skating

Trampoline gymnastics

Tug of war

Water skiing

Wheelchair rugby

Wushu

References

External links
 Official website

Medalists
2022